Cedar Hill Cemetery may refer to:

Cedar Hill Cemetery, Governor Ritchie Highway, Brooklyn Park, Maryland
Cedar Hill Cemetery (Hartford, Connecticut), in Hartford, Newington, and Wethersfield, Connecticut, listed on the NRHP in Connecticut
Cedar Hill Cemetery (Maryland), in Suitland, Maryland
Cedar Hill Cemetery (Vicksburg, Mississippi)

Cedar Hill Cemetery Buildings, Newark, Ohio, listed on the NRHP in Licking County, Ohio
Cedar Hill Cemetery (Philadelphia, Pennsylvania), a historic cemetery in the Frankford neighborhood of Philadelphia, Pennsylvania
Cedar Hill Church and Cemeteries, Lexington, Virginia, listed on the NRHP in Rockbridge County, Virginia
Cedar Hill Cemetery (Suffolk, Virginia), listed on the NRHP in Suffolk, Virginia

See also
Cedar Hill (disambiguation)